The 62nd Annual Primetime Creative Arts Emmy Awards ceremony was held on August 21, 2010 at the Nokia Theatre in Downtown Los Angeles. This was in conjunction with the annual Primetime Emmy Awards and was presented in recognition of technical and other similar achievements in American television programming. E! aired clips from the ceremony on August 28, the evening preceding the night of the primetime telecast.

Winners and nominees
Winners are listed first and highlighted in bold:

Programs
{| class="wikitable"
|+ 
|-
| style="vertical-align:top;" width="50%" | 
 Jamie Oliver's Food Revolution (ABC) Antiques Roadshow (PBS)
 Dirty Jobs (Discovery Channel)
 Kathy Griffin: My Life on the D-List (Bravo)
 MythBusters (Discovery Channel)
 Undercover Boss (CBS)
| style="vertical-align:top;" width="50%" | 
 The Betrayal – Nerakhoon (PBS) Brick City (Sundance Channel)
 My Lai (PBS)
 Patti Smith: Dream of Life (PBS)
 Pressure Cooker (BET)
 Sergio (HBO)
|-
| style="vertical-align:top;" width="50%" | 
 The National Parks: America's Best Idea (PBS) Monty Python: Almost the Truth (Lawyers Cut) (IFC)
 Life (Discovery Channel)
 American Experience (PBS)
 Deadliest Catch (Discovery Channel)
 American Masters (PBS)
| style="vertical-align:top;" width="50%" | 
 Teddy: In His Own Words (HBO) Believe: The Eddie Izzard Story (Epix)
 By the People: The Election of Barack Obama (HBO)
 Johnny Mercer: The Dream's on Me (TMC)
 Saturday Night Live in the 2000s: Time and Again (NBC)
 The Simpsons 20th Anniversary Special – In 3-D! On Ice! (Fox)
|-
| style="vertical-align:top;" width="50%" | 
 Prep & Landing (ABC) Alien Earths (Nat Geo)
 South Park (Episode: "200/201") (Comedy Central)
 The Ricky Gervais Show (Episode: "Knob At Night") (HBO)
 The Simpsons (Episode: "Once Upon a Time in Springfield") (Fox)
| style="vertical-align:top;" width="50%" | 
 Robot Chicken (Episode: Full-Assed Christmas Special) (Adult Swim) Adventure Time (Episode: "My Two Favorite People") (Cartoon Network)
 Chowder (Episode: "The Toots") (Cartoon Network)
 Kick Buttowski: Suburban Daredevil (Episode: "Racing The Schoolbus") (Disney XD)
 The Marvelous Misadventures of Flapjack (Episode: "Tee Hee Tummy Tums") (Cartoon Network)
 Uncle Grandpa (Cartoon Network)
|-
| style="vertical-align:top;" width="50%" | 
 Wizards of Waverly Place: The Movie (Disney Channel) Hannah Montana (Disney Channel)
 iCarly (Nickelodeon)
 Jonas (Disney Channel)
 Wizards of Waverly Place (Disney Channel)
| style="vertical-align:top;" width="50%" | 
 Nick News with Linda Ellerbee: The Face of Courage: Kids Living with Cancer (Nickelodeon) When Families Grieve (PBS)
|-
| style="vertical-align:top;" width="50%" colspan="2" | 
 63rd Tony Awards (CBS) 30 Rock: The Webisodes (NBC.com)
 82nd Academy Awards (ABC)
 ABC's LOST Presents: Mysteries of the Universe – The Dharma Initiative (abc.com/lost)
 The Daily Show: Ask a Correspondent (thedailyshow.com)
 Avatar: Enter The World of Pandora (HBO First Look) (HBO)
 Vancouver 2010 Olympic Winter Games Opening Ceremony (NBC)
|}

Acting

Animation
{| class="wikitable"
|+ 
|-
| style="vertical-align:top;" | 
 Prep & Landing – Andy Harkness (art director) (ABC) Prep & Landing – William M. George III (background key design) (ABC) Prep & Landing – Joe Mateo (storyboard artist) (ABC) Family Guy – Greg Colton (storyboard artist) (Episode: "Road to the Multiverse") (Fox) Generator Rex – Nora Murphy-Berden and Chu-Hui Song (background painter) (Episode: "The Day That Everything Changed") (Cartoon Network) Heart of Stone – Chris Do (art director) (VEVO.com) The Ricky Gervais Show – Andy Bialk (character design) (Episode: "Charity") (HBO) The Simpsons – Charles Ragins (background design) (Episode: "Postcards from the Wedge") (Fox)|}

Art Direction
{| class="wikitable"
|+ 
|-
| style="vertical-align:top;" width="50%" | 
 No winner
 Hell's Kitchen (Episodes: "Episode 615") (Fox)
 How I Met Your Mother (Episodes: "Duel Citizenship", "Of Course", "Hooked") (CBS)
 Rules of Engagement (Episodes: "3rd Wheel", "Ghost Story", "Atlantic City") (CBS)
 The Big Bang Theory (Episode: "The Gothowitz Deviation", "The Adhesive Duck Deficiency") (CBS)
 The New Adventures of Old Christine (Episode: "Subway", "Somehow", "Revenge Makeover", "Sweet Charity") (CBS)
| style="vertical-align:top;" width="50%" | 
 The Tudors (Episode: "Episode #407") (Showtime) Glee (Episode: "Pilot") (Fox)
 Heroes (Episode: "Brave New World") (NBC)
 Lost (Episode: "Ab Aeterno") (ABC)
 Modern Family (Episode: "Moon Landing") (ABC)
 True Blood (Episode: "Never Let Me Go") (HBO)
|-
| style="vertical-align:top;" width="50%" | 
 The Pacific (HBO) Georgia O'Keeffe (Lifetime)
 Return to Cranford (PBS)
 Temple Grandin (HBO)
 You Don't Know Jack (HBO)
| style="vertical-align:top;" width="50%" | 
 82nd Academy Awards (ABC) 63rd Tony Awards (CBS)
 American Idol (Episode: "Idol Gives Back") (Fox)
 The Tonight Show with Conan O'Brien (Episode: "#1.1") (NBC)
 The Who Super Bowl Halftime Show (CBS)
 Saturday Night Live (Episode: "Host: Jon Hamm, Host: Betty White") (NBC)
|}

Casting
{| class="wikitable"
|+ 
|-
| style="vertical-align:top;" width="50%" | 
 Modern Family (ABC) 30 Rock (NBC)
 Glee (Fox)
 Nurse Jackie (Showtime)
 United States of Tara (Showtime)
| style="vertical-align:top;" width="50%" | 
 Mad Men (AMC) Big Love (HBO)
 Dexter (Showtime)
 Friday Night Lights (NBC)
 The Good Wife (CBS)
 True Blood (HBO)
|-
| style="vertical-align:top;" width="50%" colspan="2" | 
 The Pacific (HBO) Emma (PBS)
 Georgia O'Keeffe (Lifetime)
 Temple Grandin (HBO)
 You Don't Know Jack (HBO)
|}

Choreography

Cinematography
{| class="wikitable"
|+ 
|-
| style="vertical-align:top;" width="50%" | 
 CSI: Crime Scene Investigation (Episode: "Family Affair") (CBS) Breaking Bad (Episode: "No Mas") (AMC)
 FlashForward (Episode: "No More Good Days") (ABC)
 Mad Men (Episode: "Shut the Door. Have a Seat.") (AMC)
 The Tudors (Episode: "Death of a Monarchy") (Showtime)
| style="vertical-align:top;" width="50%" | 
 Weeds (Episode: "A Modest Proposal") (Showtime) 30 Rock (Episode: "Season Four") (NBC)
 Gary Unmarried (Episode: "Gary Shoots Fish in a Barrel") (CBS)
 Hung (Episodes: "Pilot") (HBO)
 Nurse Jackie (Episode: "Apple Bong") (Showtime)
 Two and a Half Men (Episode: "Crude and Uncalled For") (CBS)
|-
| style="vertical-align:top;" width="50%" | 
 Return to Cranford (Episode: "Part 2") (PBS) The Pacific (Episode: "Peleliu Landing") (HBO)
 The Pacific (Episode: "Okinawa") (HBO)
 The Prisoner (Episode: "Checkmate") (AMC)
 You Don't Know Jack (HBO)
| style="vertical-align:top;" width="50%" | 
 Life (Episode: "Challenges of Life") (Discovery Channel) America: The Story of Us (Episode: "Division") (History Channel)
 Deadliest Catch (Episode: No Second Chances) (Discovery Channel)
 The National Parks: America's Best Idea (Episode: The Scripture of Nature) (PBS)
 Whale Wars (Episode: "The Stuff of Nightmares") (Animal Planet)
|-
| style="vertical-align:top;" width="50%" colspan="2" | 
 Survivor (Episode: "Slay Everyone, Trust No One") (CBS) Dirty Jobs (Episode: "High Rise Window Washer") (Discovery Channel)
 Man vs. Wild (Episode: "Big Sky Country") (Discovery Channel)
 The Amazing Race (Episode: "I Think We're Fighting The Germans, Right?") (CBS)
 Top Chef (Episode: "Vivre Las Vegas") (Bravo)
 Top Chef Masters (Episode: Masters Get Schooled) (Bravo)
|}

Commercial

Costuming
{| class="wikitable"
|+ 
|-
| style="vertical-align:top;" width="50%" | 
 The Tudors (Episode: "Episode #408") (Showtime) 30 Rock (Episode: "I Do Do") (NBC)
 Glee (Episode: "The Power of Madonna") (Fox)
 The Good Wife (Episode: "Crash") (CBS)
 Mad Men (Episode: "Souvenir") (AMC)
| style="vertical-align:top;" width="50%" | 
 Return to Cranford (Episode: "Part One") (PBS) Emma (Episode: "Part Two") (PBS)
 Georgia O'Keeffe (Lifetime)
 The Pacific (Episode: "Melbourne") (HBO)
 You Don't Know Jack (HBO)
|-
| style="vertical-align:top;" width="50%" colspan="2" | 
 Jimmy Kimmel Live! (Episode: "Episode 09-1266") (ABC) (TIE) So You Think You Can Dance (Episode: "Top 12 Perform") (Fox) (TIE) Titan Maximum (Episode: "Went To Party, Got Crabs") (Cartoon Network) (TIE)'''
|}

Directing

Hairstyling
{| class="wikitable"
|+ 
|-
| style="vertical-align:top;" width="50%" | 
 Mad Men (Episode: "Souvenir") (AMC) Castle (Episode: "Vampire Weekend") (ABC)
 Glee (Episode: "Hairography") (Fox)
 Glee (Episode: "The Power of Madonna") (Fox)
 The Tudors (Episode: "Episode 407") (Showtime)
 Tracey Ullman's State of The Union (Episode: "Episode 301") (Showtime)
| style="vertical-align:top;" width="50%" | 
 Dancing with the Stars (Episode: "Episode 902A") (ABC) 82nd Academy Awards (ABC)
 How I Met Your Mother (Episode; "Dopplegangers") (CBS)
 Two and a Half Men (Episode: "That's Why They Call It Ballroom") (CBS)
 Saturday Night Live (Episode: "Host: Betty White") (NBC)
|-
| style="vertical-align:top;" width="50%" colspan="2" | 
 Emma (PBS) Georgia O'Keeffe (Lifetime)
 Return to Cranford (PBS)
 Temple Grandin (HBO)
 You Don't Know Jack (HBO)
|}

Hosting

Interactive Media
{| class="wikitable"
|+ 
|-
| style="vertical-align:top;" width="50%" | 
 Star Wars: Uncut (StarWarsUncut.com) Dexter Interactive (Showtime.com)
 Glee Hyperpromo And Superfan (Fox.com)
| style="vertical-align:top;" width="50%" | 
 The Jimmy Fallon Digital Experience (LateNightWithJimmyFallon.com) The Biggest Loser Digital Experience (NBC.com)
 Top Chef: Las Vegas (Bravotv.com)
|}

Lighting Design / Direction
{| class="wikitable"
|+ 
|-
| style="vertical-align:top;" | 
 Vancouver 2010 Olympic Winter Games Opening Ceremony (NBC) 82nd Academy Awards (ABC)
 Dancing with the Stars (Episode: "Episode 909A") (ABC)
 Saturday Night Live (Episode: "Host: Betty White") (NBC)
|}

Main Title Design
{| class="wikitable"
|+ 
|-
| style="vertical-align:top;" | 
 Bored to Death (HBO) Human Target (HBO)
 Nurse Jackie (Showtime)
 Temple Grandin (HBO)
 The Pacific (HBO)
|}

Make-up
{| class="wikitable"
|+ 
|-
| style="vertical-align:top;" width="50%" | 
 Grey's Anatomy (Episode: "Suicide is Painless") (ABC) Castle (Episode: "Vampire Weekend") (ABC)
 Glee (Episode: "The Power of Madonna") (Fox)
 Glee (Episode: "Theatricality") (Fox)
 Mad Men (Episode: "Souvenir") (AMC)
| style="vertical-align:top;" width="50%" | 
 Saturday Night Live (Episode: "Host: Betty White") (NBC) Dancing with the Stars (Episode: "Episode 901A") (ABC)
 So You Think You Can Dance (Episode: "Episode #615/616A") (CBS)
 82nd Academy Awards (ABC)
 The Big Bang Theory (Episode: "The Electric Can Opener Fluctuation") (CBS)
|-
| style="vertical-align:top;" width="50%" | 
 The Pacific (HBO) Georgia O'Keeffe (Lifetime)
 You Don't Know Jack (HBO)
 Temple Grandin (HBO)
| style="vertical-align:top;" width="50%" | 
 The Pacific (HBO) Castle (Episode: "Vampire Weekend") (ABC)
 Grey's Anatomy (Episode: "How Insensitive") (ABC)
 Nip/Tuck (Episode: "Enigma") (FX)
 True Blood (Episode: "Scratches") (HBO)
|}

Music
{| class="wikitable"
|+ 
|-
| style="vertical-align:top;" width="50%" | 
 24 (Episode: "3:00 p.m. – 4:00 p.m.") (Fox) Batman: The Brave and the Bold (Episode: "Mayhem of The Music Meister!") (Cartoon Network)
 FlashForward (Episode: "No More Good Days") (ABC)
 Lost (Episode: "The End") (ABC)
 Psych (Episode: "Mr. Yin Presents...") (USA)
| style="vertical-align:top;" width="50%" | 
 Temple Grandin (HBO) Blessed Is The Match (PBS)
 Georgia O'Keeffe (Lifetime)
 The Pacific (Episode: "Home") (HBO)
 When Love Is Not Enough: The Lois Wilson Story (Hallmark Hall of Fame Presentation) (CBS)
 You Don't Know Jack (HBO)
|-
| style="vertical-align:top;" width="50%" | 
 Vancouver 2010 Olympic Winter Games Opening Ceremony (NBC) 82nd Academy Awards (ABC)
 Andrea Bocelli & David Foster: My Christmas (Great Performances) (PBS)
 Celtic Woman: Songs From The Heart (PBS)
 In Performance At The White House: Fiesta Latina (PBS)
 The Kennedy Center Honors (CBS)
| style="vertical-align:top;" width="50%" | 
 Monk (Episode: "Mr. Monk and the End: Part 2", Song: "When I'm Gone") (USA) Family Guy (Episode: "Extra Large Medium", Song: "Down's Syndrome Girl") (Fox)
 How I Met Your Mother (Episode: Girls Versus Suits, Song: "Nothing Suits Me Like A Suit") (CBS)
 Rescue Me (Episode: "Disease", Song: "How Lovely To Be A Vegetable") (FX)
 Saturday Night Live (Episode: "Host: Blake Lively", Song: "Shy Ronnie") (NBC)
 Treme (Episode: "I'll Fly Away", Song: "This City") (HBO)
|-
| style="vertical-align:top;" width="50%" colspan="2" | 
 Nurse Jackie (Showtime) Human Target (Fox)
 Justified (Fox)
 Legend of the Seeker (Syndicated)
 Warehouse 13 (Syfy)
|}

Picture Editing
{| class="wikitable"
|+ 
|-
| style="vertical-align:top;" width="50%" | 
 Lost (Episode: "The End") (ABC) Dexter (Episode: "The Getaway") (Showtime)
 Breaking Bad (Episode: "No Mas") (AMC)
 Mad Men (Episode: "The Gypsy and the Hobo") (AMC)
 Mad Men (Episode: "Guy Walks Into an Advertising Agency") (AMC)
| style="vertical-align:top;" width="50%" | 
 Modern Family (Episode: "Pilot") (ABC) 30 Rock (Episode: "Dealbreakers Talk Show #0001") (NBC)
 Curb Your Enthusiasm (Episode: "The Bare Midriff") (HBO)
 Curb Your Enthusiasm (Episode: "The Table Read") (HBO)
 Modern Family (Episode: "Family Portrait") (ABC)
|-
| style="vertical-align:top;" width="50%" | 
 Temple Grandin (HBO) The Pacific (Episode: "Peleliu Landing") (HBO)
 The Pacific (Episode: "Iwo Jima") (HBO)
 The Pacific (Episode: "Okinawa") (HBO)
 You Don't Know Jack (HBO)
| style="vertical-align:top;" width="50%" | 
 Intervention (Episode: "Robby") (A&E) The Amazing Race (Episode: "I Think We're Fighting The Germans, Right?") (CBS)
 Extreme Makeover: Home Edition (Episode: "Extreme Makeover: The Muppet Edition") (ABC)
 Survivor (Episode: "Tonight, We Make Our Move") (CBS)
 Top Chef (Episode: "Vivre Las Vegas") (Bravo)
|-
| style="vertical-align:top;" width="50%" | 
 By the People: The Election of Barack Obama (HBO) America: The Story of Us (Episode: "Division") (History Channel)
 Deadliest Catch (Episode: "No Second Chances") (Discovery Channel)
 Life (Episode: "Challenges on Life") (Discovery Channel)
 Whale Wars (Episode: "The Stuff of Nightmares") (Animal Planet)
| style="vertical-align:top;" width="50%" | 
 The 25th Anniversary Rock And Roll Hall of Fame Concert (HBO) Kathy Griffin: Balls of Steel (Bravo)
 Robin Williams: Weapons of Self Destruction (HBO)
 The Kennedy Center Honors (CBS)
|-
| style="vertical-align:top;" width="50%" colspan="2" | 
 Late Night with Jimmy Fallon (6-Bee, "Episode 226") (NBC) 82nd Academy Awards (Horror Tribute) (ABC)
 82nd Academy Awards (John Hughes Tribute) (ABC)
 American Idol (Dream, "Episode 924/925A") (Discovery Channel)
 Jimmy Kimmel Live! (The Handsome Men's Club, "Episode 10-1330") (ABC)
 Jimmy Kimmel Live! (The Late Night Wars, "Episode 10-1304") (ABC)
|}

Sound
{| class="wikitable"
|+ 
|-
| style="vertical-align:top;" width="50%" | 
 24 (Episode: "4:00 am – 5:00 am") (Fox) Breaking Bad (Episode: "One Minute") (AMC)
 Fringe (Episode: "White Tulip") (Fox)
 Lost (Episode: "The End") (ABC)
 True Blood (Episode: "Beyond Here Lies Nothin") (HBO)
| style="vertical-align:top;" width="50%" | 
 The Pacific (Episode: "Part Five") (HBO) Alice (Episode: "Part 1") (Syfy)
 Temple Grandin (HBO)
 Moonshot (History Channel)
|-
| style="vertical-align:top;" width="50%" | 
 America: The Story of Us (Episode: "Division") (History Channel) Life (Episode: "Challenges on Life") (Discovery Channel)
 Teddy: In His Own Words (HBO)
 The Amazing Race (Episode: "I Think We're Fighting the Germans, Right?") (CBS)
 The National Parks: America's Best Idea (Episode: The Scripture of Nature) (PBS)
| style="vertical-align:top;" width="50%" | 
 Glee (Episode: "The Power of Madonna") (Fox) 24 (Episode: "3:00 p.m. – 4:00 p.m.") (Fox)
 Dexter (Episode: "Hello, Dexter Morgan") (Showtime)
 House (Episode: "Epic Fail") (Fox)
 Lost (Episode: "The End") (ABC)
|-
| style="vertical-align:top;" width="50%" | 
 The Pacific (Episode: "Basilone") (HBO) The Pacific (Episode: "Peleliu Landing") (HBO)
 The Pacific (Episode: "Iwo Jima") (HBO)
 The Pacific (Episode: "Okinawa") (HBO)
| style="vertical-align:top;" width="50%" | 
 Entourage (Episode: "One Car, Two Car, Red Car, Blue Car") (HBO) Modern Family (Episode: "En Garde") (ABC) 30 Rock (Episode: "Argus") (NBC)
 The Office (Episode: "Niagara") (NBC)
 Two and a Half Men (Episode: "Fart Jokes, Pie and Celeste") (CBS)
|-
| style="vertical-align:top;" width="50%" | 
 The 25th Anniversary Rock And Roll Hall of Fame Concert (HBO) (TIE) 53rd Grammy Awards (CBS) (TIE) American Idol (Episode: "Episode #943 Finale") (Fox)
 Dancing with the Stars (Episode: "Episode #907") (ABC)
 American Idol (Episode: "Episode #933 Idol Gives Back") (Fox)
 82nd Academy Awards (ABC)
| style="vertical-align:top;" width="50%" | 
 Deadliest Catch (Episode: "No Second Chances") (Discovery Channel) Life (Episode: "Challenges of Life") (Discovery Channel)
 Spectacle Elvis Costello With... (Episode: "Spectacle Elvis Costello With Bruce Springsteen – Part 1 & 2") (Sundance Channel)
 The Amazing Race (Episode: "I Think We're Fighting the Germans, Right?") (CBS)
 The National Parks: America's Best Idea (Episode: "The Scripture of Nature") (PBS)
|}

Special Visual Effects
{| class="wikitable"
|+ 
|-
| style="vertical-align:top;" width="50%" | 
 CSI: Crime Scene Investigation (Episode: "Family Affair") (CBS) Stargate Universe (Episode: "Air") (Syfy)
 Stargate Universe (Episode: "Space") (Syfy)
 Caprica (Episode: "There Is Another Sky") (Syfy)
 V (Episode: "Pilot") (ABC)
| style="vertical-align:top;" width="50%" | 
 The Pacific (Episode: "Peleliu Landing") (HBO) Ben 10: Alien Swarm (Cartoon Network)
 The Pacific (Episode: "Guadalcanal/Leckie") (HBO)
 Virtuality (Fox)
|}

Stunt Coordination
{| class="wikitable"
|+ 
|-
| style="vertical-align:top;" | 
 FlashForward (Episode: "No More Good Days") (ABC) 24 (Episode: "6:00 p.m. – 7:00 p.m.") (Fox)
 Chuck (Episode: "Chuck Vs. The Tic Tac") (NBC)
 House (Episode: "Brave Heart") (Fox)
 Human Target (Episode: "Run") (Fox)
|}

Technical Direction
{| class="wikitable"
|+ 
|-
| style="vertical-align:top;" width="50%" | 
 Dancing with the Stars (Episode: "Episode 909A") (ABC) Late Show With David Letterman (Episode: "Episode 3150") (CBS)
 Saturday Night Live (Episode: "Host: Joseph Gordon-Levitt") (NBC)
 The Big Bang Theory (Episode: "The Adhesive Duck Deficiency") (CBS)
 The Daily Show With Jon Stewart (Episode: "Episode 15032") (Comedy Central)
| style="vertical-align:top;" width="50%" | 
 The 25th Anniversary Rock And Roll Hall of Fame Concert (HBO)' 52nd Grammy Awards (CBS)
 82nd Academy Awards (ABC)
 Robin Williams: Weapons of Self Destruction (HBO)
 The Kennedy Center Honors (CBS)
|}

Writing
{| class="wikitable"
|+ 
|-
| style="vertical-align:top;" width="50%" | 
 'The National Parks: America's Best Idea (Episode: "The Last Refuge") (PBS) America: The Story of Us (Episode: "Division") (History Channel)
 Anthony Bourdain: No Reservations (Episode: "Prague") (Travel Channel)
 Life (Episode: "Challenges of Life") (Discovery Channel)
 The Budda (PBS)
| style="vertical-align:top;" width="50%" | 
 The Colbert Report (Comedy Central)' The Daily Show with Jon Stewart (Comedy Central)
 Real Time with Bill Maher (HBO)
 Saturday Night Live (NBC)
 The Tonight Show with Conan O'Brien (NBC)
|}

Programs with multiple awards
By network 
 ABC – 16
 HBO – 16
 Fox – 8
 PBS – 7
 CBS – 6
 NBC – 5

 By program
 The Pacific – 6
 Prep & Landing – 4

Programs with multiple nominations
By network
 HBO – 68
 ABC – 49
 CBS – 38

By program
 The Pacific – 19
 82nd Academy Awards – 12
 Glee'' – 9

Note

References

External links
 Academy of Television Arts and Sciences website

062 Creative Arts
2010 television awards
2010 in Los Angeles
August 2010 events in the United States